Saint Peter Parish can refer to:
Saint Peter Parish, Antigua and Barbuda
Saint Peter Parish, Barbados
Saint Peter Parish, Dominica
Saint Peter Parish, Montserrat

Civil parishes in the Caribbean
Parish name disambiguation pages